The electoral district of Sunbury is an electoral district of the Victorian Legislative Assembly in Australia. It was created in the redistribution of electoral boundaries in 2013, and came into effect at the 2014 state election.

It is a new district that was created in the fast-growing outer northwestern fringe of Melbourne from areas in the district of Macedon. It is centred on the city of Sunbury, and includes the towns of Diggers Rest, Bulla, Westmeadows and Gladstone Park.

Sunbury was estimated to be a fairly safe Labor seat with a margin of 6.5% at the time of its creation. Labor member Josh Bull became the first member for Sunbury at the 2014 election.

Members

Election results

References

External links
 District profile from the Victorian Electoral Commission

Sunbury, Electoral district of
Sunbury, Victoria
2014 establishments in Australia
City of Hume
City of Melton
Electoral districts and divisions of Greater Melbourne